HMS Plantagenet was a 74-gun third rate ship of the line of the Royal Navy, launched on 22 October 1801 at Woolwich. She was designed by Sir William Rule as one of the 'large class' 74s, and was the only ship built to her draught. As a large 74, she carried 24-pounder guns on her upper gun deck instead of the 18-pounder guns found on the middling and common class 74s.

Career
In 1803 she and  captured the French privateer sloop Atalante, of 22 guns, after a chase of nine hours. Plantagenet took off 90 Frenchmen and put a prize crew of 20 Englishmen, under the command of Lieutenant Batt, on board Atalante. After the two vessels had separated, 68 Frenchmen, who had concealed themselves below decks, rose and attempted to retake their vessel. The British were able to subdue the Frenchmen, but not before one British sailor had been shot dead by one of his crewmates, who had mistaken the dead man for a Frenchman. The later report described Atalante as being armed with sixteen 6-pounder guns and 160 men. She had been out of Bordeaux five days but had captured nothing.

In June 1804 Plantagenet, Captain De Courcy, escorted the China Fleet of the British East India Company from Saint Helena back to England. This was the fleet that had scared off a French squadron of warships in the Battle of Pulo Aura.

On 27 September 1810 Plantagenet and  shared in the capture of the Danish schooner Toujours Fidele.

On 12 March 1812, as the merchant ship  was returning from Lima and Cadiz, the French privateer Amelia captured her. However,  recaptured Ramoncita.

During the War of 1812, as the ship was moored near Norfolk, Virginia, attempts were made to destroy her with torpedoes built to Robert Fulton's specifications, but this came to nothing.

On 16 December 1813, Planagenets boats captured the American letter of marque schooner Rapid, off Havana. Rapid, Captain James Frazier, had been launched at Talbot County, Maryland in 1813. She was of 115 tons (bm), had a crew of 20, and was armed with one nine-pounder gun.

Fate
Plantagenet was broken up in 1817.

Notes

Citations

References

 
 Lavery, Brian (2003) The Ship of the Line - Volume 1: The development of the battlefleet 1650-1850. Conway Maritime Press. .

External links
 

Ships of the line of the Royal Navy
1801 ships
War of 1812 ships of the United Kingdom